Saint Sophia Greek Orthodox Cathedral (in Greek: Ἁγία Σοφία, Hagia Sophia) is a Greek Orthodox church built in 1952, in what was then the Greek section of Central Los Angeles, California. It is located at West 15th Street and South Normandie Avenue in the Byzantine-Latino Quarter

History
This Greek Orthodox church is the result of a Hollywood success story. When Charles Skouras and his brothers, Spyros Skouras and George Skouras, were still trying to get ahead in Hollywood, Charles made a vow to God that he would build the most majestic cathedral if God would grant him success in show business. He became head of Fox West Coast, so he built the Saint Sophia in Los Angeles. 

In 2005 at the 36th Biennial Clergy-Laity Congress of the Greek Orthodox Archdiocese of America, the liturgy was given in Spanish, English, and Greek, with Orthodox children from a Tijuana, Mexico, orphanage providing music.

Architecture
The cathedral has a simplified  Byzantine Revival—Renaissance Revival-influenced exterior.  The interior was designed with more decorative features. 

Saint Sophia Cathedral is a Los Angeles Historic-Cultural Monument.

Congregation
The cathedral still draws its predominantly Greek congregation of as many as 1,000 from perhaps a 60-mile radius – from throughout Los Angeles and Orange Counties. Los Angeles's Greek community has never been centralized, as in other cities such as New York City and Chicago.

Members of the church congregation have included Hollywood actors such as Telly Savalas, whose funeral was held there. Dr. Tom Apostle and Sharon Lawrence married at the church in 2002.

Notable members
George Chakiris
Telly Savalas
Tom Hanks
Rita Wilson
Peggy Stevenson — Los Angeles City Council member, 1975–1985.

In popular culture 
The church is featured in Visiting... with Huell Howser Episode 511.

The wedding scene in Bram Stoker's Dracula (1992 film) was filmed in the nave of this church. In rapper Ice Cube's 1993 music video It Was a Good Day, the church can be seen in the background of the basketball scene.

See also
 List of Los Angeles Historic-Cultural Monuments in South Los Angeles
Greek Orthodox cathedrals in the United States

References

External links
Official Saint Sophia Cathedral website
Saint Sophia
Cathedrals of California

Cathedrals in Los Angeles
Harvard Heights, Los Angeles
European-American culture in Los Angeles
Eastern Orthodox churches in California
Greek Orthodox cathedrals in the United States
Greek-American culture in California
Los Angeles Historic-Cultural Monuments
Churches completed in 1952
20th-century Eastern Orthodox church buildings
Church buildings with domes
Byzantine Revival architecture in California